Lujo Records is an American independent record label that was founded in 2001 by Erik Aucoin in Louisiana. In 2004, Lujo Records moved to Washington, D.C., and Jocelyn Toews bought 50% of the label. In 2006 Aucoin and Toews married and in 2008 they moved the label to Palo Alto, California. Lujo has released records by The Fall of Troy, Look Mexico, The Dark Romantics, Baby Teeth, Pomegranates and more.

Roster
 A Lull
 All City Affairs
 Baby Teeth
 Bluebrain
 Cool Hand Luke
 The Dark Romantics
 Death House Chaplain
 Discover America
 Enlou
 The Gena Rowlands Band
 New Brutalism
 The Out Circuit
 Roy
 Suffering and the Hideous Thieves
 The Torches
 Yourself & the Air

Past
 The Fall of Troy (Active, unsigned)
 Frantic Mantis
 Look Mexico (Active, on Adeline Records)
 Pomegranates (currently inactive)
 In Praise of Folly (Disbanded, members now play as Mt. St. Helens Vietnam Band)
 Ateriavia (disbanded, members play in A Lull)
 Mouse Fire (disbanded)
 The Evaluation (disbanded)
 History (Invades)

See also
 List of record labels

References

External links 
 Official site

American independent record labels
Alternative rock record labels
Record labels established in 2001